The Boulzane is a river in the south of France. Its source is in Aude, near Montfort-sur-Boulzane. It flows through Lapradelle-Puilaurens, Gincla, Caudiès-de-Fenouillèdes before it empties into the Agly near Saint-Paul-de-Fenouillet.

Tributaries
 Babils
 Ginnesta

References

Rivers of France
Rivers of Aude
Rivers of Pyrénées-Orientales
Rivers of Occitania (administrative region)